Marofangady is a town and commune in Madagascar. It belongs to the district of Arivonimamo, which is a part of Itasy Region.

Demographics

2001 Census 
The population of the commune was estimated to be approximately 3,000 in 2001 commune census.

Education 
Only primary schooling is available.

Employment 
The majority 98% of the population of the commune are farmers, while an additional 1% receives their livelihood from raising livestock. Services provide employment for 1% of the population.

Agriculture 
The most important crop is rice, while other important products are cassava and potatoes.

References and notes 

Populated places in Itasy Region